Evelyn Abena Akuaba Appiah (born June 2, 1993) is a Ghanaian–American singer, model and beauty queen who was crowned Queen Beauty Universe 2016 and Miss Grand International 2020. She was appointed as Miss Grand USA and became the first Black woman to win the Miss Grand International crown. She previously represented Ghana in two of the Big Four international beauty pageants but lost in Miss Universe 2014 and Miss Earth 2019.

Early career 
Abena is also a singer who has released several singles, including "Akomah" (2015), "Earth" (2019), "No Hit and Run" (2019) and "No More Hate" (2021). She has worked as a model, appearing in music videos for "Wake Up in the Sky" sung by Bruno Mars, Gucci Mane and Kodak Black, as well as "El Anillo" by Jennifer Lopez.

Pageantry 
Abena started joining pageants when she won Top Model Ghana in 2013 and represented her country in Top Model of the World where she finished at top 15. The following year, she represented Ghana in Miss Universe 2014 but she was unplaced.

She joined Miss World America 2017 representing New York. After couple of years, she represented Ghana again at Miss Earth 2019, where she placed in the Top 20 and won several awards. She trained under the Kagandahang Flores camp, a Philippines-based pageant camp that trains aspiring beauty queens for local and international pageants.

Miss Grand International 2020
She joined Miss Grand USA 2020, where she was hailed as the winner and the first African-American to win the title. She eventually crowned as the winner of Miss Grand International 2020 by the outgoing titleholder Miss Grand International 2019, Valentina Figuera of Venezuela, on March 27, 2021, at Show DC Hall in Bangkok, Thailand making her the first woman from the United States to win the crown.

Placements

References

External links

 

Miss Grand International winners
1993 births
Living people
Ghanaian beauty pageant winners
Ghanaian female models
Miss Universe 2014 contestants
People from Accra
People from New York City